"Re-Rewind (The Crowd Say Bo Selecta)" is a song by English garage duo Artful Dodger, featuring Craig David on vocals. Released in the United Kingdom on 29 November 1999, the song reached number two, giving both Artful Dodger and David their first chart hit. In his dean's list for the annual Pazz & Jop critics' poll, Robert Christgau of The Village Voice named "Re-Rewind" the fifth-best single of the year.

Background
The melody in the verses was lifted from an older Craig David demo called "Last Night", which was re-recorded for his debut studio album, Born to Do It. A slightly different version of the song, simply titled "Rewind", was featured on Born to Do It and was credited solely to Craig David and contained no vocals but David's. "Re-Rewind" is notable for being the first record signed by influential label Relentless Records and as such the first one to establish the imprint as a pioneering force within mainstream music.

In February 2016, David revealed that, after the recording session, the song was nearly lost forever: "We finished the song and dubbed it onto a little TDK D90 cassette to go and play it in the car," he says. "It sounded good but there was a couple of little tweaks we wanted to do – and literally as [producer Mark Hill] turned the computer on, all we saw was this 'error, file number' message. The only way to get rid of it was to press OK. So we pressed OK, and it kept coming up with new error numbers. So we'd press OK, press OK, press OK. But when we looked at the session, all that we saw was the hi-hats. I was like, 'are you actually for real?' So that plastic TDK tape became gold dust. We had the whole song on there, and we had to use the recording as our reference, playing it very carefully so it didn't get chewed up, and trying to remember all the things we did. And that was 'Re-Rewind'."

Track listings

Standard CD single and UK cassette single
 "Re-Rewind (The Crowd Say Bo Selecta)" (radio edit)
 "Re-Rewind (The Crowd Say Bo Selecta)" (Bump 'N' Flex Sweet 'N' Low mix)
 "Re-Rewind (The Crowd Say Bo Selecta)" (Sharp Club vocal remix)

UK 12-inch single
A1. "Re-Rewind (The Crowd Say Bo Selecta)" (radio edit)
A2. "Re-Rewind (The Crowd Say Bo Selecta)" (Bump 'N' Flex Sweet 'N' Low mix)
B1. "Re-Rewind (The Crowd Say Bo Selecta)" (Sharp Addiction to DTPM dub)

European CD single
 "Re-Rewind (The Crowd Say Bo Selecta)" (radio edit)
 "Re-Rewind (The Crowd Say Bo Selecta)" (Sharp Club vocal remix)

US cassette single
 "Re-Rewind (The Crowd Say Bo Selecta)" (radio edit)
 "Re-Rewind (The Crowd Say Bo Selecta)" (Sweet n' Low mix)

Charts

Weekly charts

Year-end charts

Certifications

Release history

In popular culture
It is from this song that Leigh Francis's Channel 4 comedy series Bo' Selecta! took its name.

References

1999 songs
1999 singles
Artful Dodger (duo) songs
Craig David songs
Relentless Records singles
Republic Records singles
Songs written by Craig David
Songs written by Mark Hill (musician)